PP-32 Gujrat-V is a Constituency of Provincial Assembly of Punjab.

2018 Elections

General elections are scheduled to be held on 25 July 2018.

See also
 PP-31 Gujrat-IV
 PP-33 Gujrat-VI

References

Provincial constituencies of Punjab, Pakistan